The Church of Our Lady of Good Counsel is a parish church in the Roman Catholic Archdiocese of New York, located at 230 East 90th Street, Manhattan, New York City. The parish was established in 1886. The church was completed in 1892 to the designs by Thomas H. Poole. The address listed in 1892 was 236 East 90th Street.

Harry Connick Jr. was the church pianist, as a little-known teen in 1985–1987.

References

External links 
 Our Lady of Good Counsel and St. Thomas More Official Site

Religious organizations established in 1886
Roman Catholic churches in Manhattan
Roman Catholic churches completed in 1892
19th-century Roman Catholic church buildings in the United States
Thomas Henry Poole buildings
Upper East Side